Frithjof Melchior Blumer Ulleberg (10 September 1911 – 31 January 1993) was a Norwegian football (soccer) player who competed in the 1936 Summer Olympics. He was a member of the Norwegian team, which won the bronze medal in the football tournament.

He also took part in the 1938 FIFA World Cup.

References

External links
profile

1911 births
1993 deaths
Norwegian footballers
Footballers at the 1936 Summer Olympics
Olympic footballers of Norway
Olympic bronze medalists for Norway
Norway international footballers
1938 FIFA World Cup players
Olympic medalists in football
Medalists at the 1936 Summer Olympics
Association football forwards